Cheilosia longula is a Palearctic hoverfly.

Description
External images 
For terms see Morphology of DipteraCheilosia longula shares bare eyes, partly pale legs, rather long wings and fused antennal pits with Cheolosia soror and Cheilosia scutellata but it is smaller (wing
length 6-8·25 mm., body length 6.0 to 9.0 mm) and darker than these species. The central facial knob is confined to the middle of face (although the face is swollen to the 
eye-margins) and is not semicircular viewed from above as it is in C. scutellata. The
front tarsi are brownish or blackish. The scutellar bristles are rather long, median pair at least as long as scutellum and the  arista has rather short but obvious hairs . In the female the scutellum usually has a yellowish tip and the humeri are usually yellowish. The sternopleuron  of females is  usually yellow along the posterior margin. In females the frons has minute sparse punctation and is without a median groove. The larva is described and figured by Rotheray (1994). 
See references for determination.

Distribution
Range: Fennoscandia south to the Pyrenees Italy and Yugoslavia.Ireland eastwards through USSR to eastern Siberia

Habitat
The habitat is deciduous and coniferous forest and conifer plantations in glades, clearings, and by tracks and taiga

Biology
Adults fly at heights up to 3m, often settling on low-growing vegetation in dappled sunlight. Flowers visited include species of Achillea, Calluna, Cirsium, Euphorbia, Galium and Potentilla erecta. Flies from the end of June to October, with a peak in September.The larva is an internal feeder on the tissues of various large, woodland basidiomycetes mainly Boletus, Leccinum and Suillus.

References

Diptera of Europe
Eristalinae
Insects described in 1838